Aulaconotus is a genus of beetles in the family Cerambycidae, containing the following species:

 Aulaconotus atronotatus Pic, 1927
 Aulaconotus gracilicornis Makihara & A. Saito, 1985
 Aulaconotus grammopterus Breuning, 1940
 Aulaconotus incorrugatus Gressitt, 1939
 Aulaconotus pachypezoides Thomson, 1864
 Aulaconotus satoi Hasegawa, 2003
 Aulaconotus semiaulaconotus (Hayashi, 1966)
 Aulaconotus szetschuanus Breuning, 1969

References

Agapanthiini